Ishan Cooper (born 29 September 1978) is an Australian musician and producer, best known for his guitar playing and solo albums "Mannequin Moonwalk" (2012) and "Coop DeVille presents Bat Funk Crazy... In 3D!!!" (2015).  Cooper also performs and records under the stage name Coop DeVille.

Associated acts include George Clinton and Parliament Funkadelic, Angelo Moore (Fishbone) aka Dr Maddvibe, Kokane and fDeluxe (formerly The Family).

References

Australian guitarists
Living people
1978 births
21st-century guitarists